Ralph Motson Thompson (1892 – 1 July 1916) was an English amateur footballer who played in the Football League for Grimsby Town as an outside left.

Personal life 
Thompson's father John was chairman of Grimsby Town in 1905 and 1906 and his brother Albert also played for the club. Thompson himself was educated at Silcoates School and in 1911, he was working as a trainee auctioneer. Six weeks after the outbreak of the First World War, Thompson enlisted as a private in the Lincolnshire Regiment on 17 September 1914. While serving with the Grimsby Chums, he was wounded in the neck, arm and spine during the attack on Ovillers-la-Boisselle on the first day of the Somme in 1916. He could not be evacuated and was later found and buried. Thompson is commemorated on the Thiepval Memorial.

Career statistics

References

1892 births
1916 deaths
Footballers from Grimsby
English footballers
English Football League players
Association football outside forwards
British Army personnel of World War I
Royal Lincolnshire Regiment soldiers
British military personnel killed in the Battle of the Somme
Grimsby Town F.C. players
Grimsby St John's F.C. players
English auctioneers
Military personnel from Lincolnshire
People educated at Silcoates School
20th-century English businesspeople